Paula Kalenberg (born 9 November 1986) is a German actress. She is probably best known to international audiences for her roles in films Krabat, Vision – From the Life of Hildegard von Bingen and Jew Suss: Rise and Fall.

Career 
Kalenberg began her career in 2001, after hearing about a casting on the radio. She appeared in two television films, Hanna – Where Are You? (Hanna – Wo bist Du?) in 2001, and In the End the Truth (Am Ende die Wahrheit) in 2002. In 2003, apart from appearing in television series Vice Squad (Die Sitte) and Tatort (Tatort), Kalenberg also made her film debut, in drama The Puppet Grave Digger (Der Puppengräber). In Intrigue and Love, Kalenberg starred as Luise Miller, opposite famous German actor August Diehl.
	
In 2006, Kalenberg starred film The Cloud, based on the novel Die Wolke, for which she won the New Faces Award for Best Actress. She then starred the 2007 drama What Counts at the End (Was am Ende zählt). In 2008, Kalenberg appeared in various projects on television and film, the most notably fantasy film Krabat, opposite David Kross and Daniel Brühl, and mini–series Rosamunde Pilcher – The Four Seasons (Rosamunde Pilcher – Die vier Jahreszeiten). The following year, she starred two short and two full– length films, A Song Sleeps in All Things (Schläft ein Lied in allen Dingen) and Vision – From the Life of Hildegard von Bingen (Vision – Aus dem Leben der Hildegard von Binge). The later one earned her Lilli Palmer Memorial Camera at the 2009 Golden Camera Awards ceremony.

In 2010, Kalenberg portrayed Kristina Söderbaum in film Jew Suss: Rise and Fall, winning Askania Award for Shooting Star. In 2011, she made episode appearances of television series Countdown – The Haunt Begins (Countdown – Die Jagd beginnt) and Wilsberg, and acted in film Adam's End (Adams Ende). It was announced Kalenberg would star a new television film, Löwenstein, which is expected to be released in 2012.

Personal life 
Kalenberg was born in Dinslaken, near Düsseldorf, currently she lives in Berlin. She named Mata Hari as the role she would like to play.

Filmography

Awards and nominations

References

External links 
 Official Website 
 

1986 births
21st-century German actresses
Actresses from Berlin
German film actresses
German television actresses
Living people
People from Wesel (district)